Mazzola is an Italian surname. Notable people with the surname include:

Alessandro Mazzola (footballer born 1969), Italian footballer
Caterino Mazzolà, Italian poet and librettist
Denia Mazzola, Italian operatic soprano
Ferruccio Mazzola, Italian footballer
Frank Mazzola, American film editor
Girolamo Mazzola Bedoli (1500–1569), Italian painter
Guerino Mazzola, Swiss mathematician
Joey Mazzola, American guitarist
José Altafini, Brazilian footballer who played under the name Mazzola
Marissa Mazzola-McMahon, American film producer
Parmigianino (1503–1540), Italian painter
Rose Mazzola, American musician
Sandro Mazzola, Italian footballer
Valentino Mazzola, Italian footballer

Italian-language surnames